Alec Wilkinson (born March 29, 1952) is an American writer who has been on the staff of The New Yorker since 1980. According to The Philadelphia Inquirer  he is among the "first rank of" contemporary American (20th and early 21st century) "literary journalists...(reminiscent) of Naipaul, Norman Mailer and Agee".

Career
Wilkinson is the author of eleven books. His most recent book is A Divine Language: Learning Algebra, Geometry, and Calculus at the Edge of Old Age.  Before that, he published The Ice Balloon in 2012, an account of the Swedish visionary aeronaut S.A. Andree's attempt, in 1897, to discover the North Pole by flying to it in a hydrogen balloon. He is also the author of "Sister Sorry," a play based on "The Confession,"  a story of his that appeared in The New Yorker in 1993. “Sister Sorry” had its premiere at  Barrington Stage Company in Pittsfield, Massachusetts during their 2021 season.

Before Wilkinson was a writer, he spent a year as a policeman in Wellfleet, Massachusetts, on Cape Cod, which is the subject of Midnights, a Year with the Wellfleet Police, and before that he was a rock and roll musician, playing in a number of bands, including one in Berkeley, California with Tony Garnier, Bob Dylan's longtime bass player and bandleader.

Wilkinson began writing when he was 24, showing work to William Maxwell, his father's friend, who in addition to being a novelist and short-story writer, had for forty years been an editor of fiction at The New Yorker. They worked together closely for years. Maxwell died in July 2000. My Mentor describes their friendship.

Personal life
Wilkinson is married, has a son, and lives in New York City. He is the brother of computer scientist Leland Wilkinson.

Awards
Wilkinson's honors include a Lyndhurst Prize and a Robert F. Kennedy Book Award. He received a Guggenheim fellowship in 1987.

Publications

Books
Midnights, a Year with the Wellfleet Police. New York: Random House, 1982.
Moonshine: a Life in Pursuit of White Liquor. New York: Knopf, 1985. .
Big Sugar (1989).
The Riverkeeper (1992). 
A Violent Act (1993). 
My Mentor (2002). 
Mr. Apology and other essays (2003). 
The Happiest Man in the World (2007). 
The protest singer : an Intimate Portrait of Pete Seeger. New York: Alfred A. Knopf, 2009. 
The Ice Balloon (2012). 
A Divine Language (2022).

Articles
 "Illuminating the Brain's 'Utter Darkness'" (review of Benjamin Ehrlich, The Brain in Search of Itself: Santiago Ramón y Cajal and the Story of the Neuron, Farrar, Straus and Giroux, 2023, 447 pp.; and Timothy J. Jorgensen, Spark: The Life of Electricity and the Electricity of Life, Princeton University Press, 2021, 436 pp.), The New York Review of Books, vol. LXX, no. 2 (February 9, 2023), pp. 32, 34–35.

References

External links
Alec Wilkinson's contributor profile on The New Yorker
Sample text from Mr. Apology and Other Essays by Alec Wilkinson.

1952 births
Living people
Bennington College alumni
The New Yorker people
The New Yorker staff writers
20th-century American journalists
American male journalists
Hackley School alumni